The Emperor of All Maladies: A Biography of Cancer is a book written by Siddhartha Mukherjee, an Indian-born American physician and oncologist. It was published on 16 November 2010 by Scribner.

Reception 
The Emperor of All Maladies won the 2011 Pulitzer Prize for General Non-Fiction: the jury called it "an elegant inquiry, at once clinical and personal". The Guardian wrote that "Mukherjee manages to convey not only a forensically precise picture of what he sees, but a shiver too, of what he feels." Literary Review commended Mukherjee's narrative: "It is so well written, and the science is so clearly explained, that it reads almost like a detective story – which, of course, it is."

Title 

The book explains its title in its author's note:

Content 

The book weaves together Mukherjee's experiences as a hematology/oncology fellow at Massachusetts General Hospital as well as the history of cancer treatment and research. Mukherjee gives the history of cancer from its first identification 4,600 years ago by the Egyptian physician Imhotep. The Greeks had no understanding of cells, but they were familiar with hydraulics. Hippocrates thus considered illness to be an imbalance of four cardinal fluids: blood, black bile, yellow bile, phlegm. Galen applied this idea to cancer, believing it to be an imbalance of black bile. In 440 BCE, the Greek historian Herodotus  recorded the first breast tumor excision of Atossa, the queen of Persia and the daughter of Cyrus, by a Greek slave named Democedes. The procedure was believed to have been successful temporarily. Galen's theory was later challenged by the work of Andreas Vaselius and Matthew Baille, whose dissections of human bodies failed to reveal black bile. 

In the 19th century, surgeons devised various approaches to remove tumors, like William Halsted and the radical mastectomy. Additionally, Emil Grubbe used X-rays to treat cancer, thus identifying another treatment modality. Rudolph Virchow first observed leukemia, and Franz Ernst Christian Neumann localized the pathology to the bone marrow.

In the 20th century, cancer became the second most common cause of death after heart disease in the United States. Sidney Farber induced temporary remission in pediatric leukemia using antifolates developed by Yellapragada Subbarow. Louis Goodman and Alfred Gilman also used nitrogen mustard to treat lymphoma. The National Cancer Institute (NCI) introduced clinical trials to test the efficacy of chemotherapy. Recognizing the possibility for a cure, Farber sought funding for his efforts through The Jimmy Fund and Mary Lasker. Inspired by the Space Race, Farber and Lasker appealed to the nation and President Nixon to enact legislation for the War on Cancer, resulting in the passage of the National Cancer Act of 1971 and increased funding for the NCI.

The book also reviews the origins of hospice and palliative medicine and cancer screening.

According to Mukherjee, the book was a response to the demand of a patient: "I'm willing to go on fighting, but I need to know what it is that I'm battling." Mukherjee states that two of his influences for the book were Randy Shilts' And the Band Played On and Richard Rhodes' The Making of the Atomic Bomb, but the defining moment for him was "when he conceived of his book as a biography".

It was described, by the magazine TIME, as one of the 100 most influential books of the last 100 years, and by The New York Times magazine as among the 100 best works of non-fiction.

Chapters 
 OF BLACKE CHOLOR, WITHOUT BOYLING: Early understandings of cancer
 AN IMPATIENT WAR: Chemotherapy and other modern (20th century) forms of treatment
 WILL YOU TURN ME OUT IF I CAN'T GET BETTER: Failures of treatments and dominant theories; paradigm shifts in the 1970s
 PREVENTION IS THE CURE: Preventive medicine applied to cancer in the United States
 A DISTORTED VERSION OF OUR NORMAL SELVES: The cellular nature of cancer
 THE FRUITS OF LONG ENDEAVORS: A review on the contemporary state-of-the-art and the victories from a long line of research

The epilogue, "Atossa's War", discusses prognosis and the ultimate goals of cancer treatment.

Awards and honours
 2011: Pulitzer Prize for General Nonfiction, winner
 2011: PEN/E. O. Wilson Literary Science Writing Award, winner (inaugural)
 2011: Guardian First Book Award, winner
 2011: Wellcome Trust Book Prize, shortlist
 2010: New York Times Best Books of the Year
 2010: New York Times Notable Book of the Year
 2010: New York Times Bestseller
 2010: TIME Magazine's Best Books of the Year
 2010: National Book Critics Circle Award, finalist
 2010: Los Angeles Times Book Prize, finalist

Translations 
 2011: Italian: L' imperatore del male. Una biografia del cancro, Neri Pozza.
 2011: Korean: 암 : 만병의 황제의 역사, 이한음.
 2012: Turkish: Tüm Hastalıkların Şahı, Zeynep Arık Tozar.
 2012: German: Der König aller Krankheiten, Barbara Schaden.
 2012: Lithuanian: Visų ligų karalius: vėžio biografija, leidykla "Versus aureus".
 2012: Portuguese: O Imperador de Todos os Males. Uma biografia do cancro, Bertrand Editora
 2012: Spanish: "El emperador de todos los males: Una biografia del Cancer" editorial Taurus
 2013: French: L'empereur de toutes les maladies. Une biographie du cancer, Éditions Flammarion.
 2013: Dutch: De keizer aller ziektes, een biografie van kanker, de Bezige Bij.
 2013: Russian: Царь всех болезней. Биография рака, АСТ, .
 2013: Ukrainian: Імператор усіх хвороб: біографія раку, Київ, видавництво Жупанського.
 2013: Polish: Cesarz wszech chorób: Biografia raka, Wydawnictwo Czarne
 2013: Bulgarian: Императорът на всички болести: Биография на рака, Изток - Запад
 2013: Hungarian: Betegségek betegsége: mindent a rákról, Libri
 2013: Arabic: إمبراطور الأمراض: سيرة ذاتية للسرطان, Tariq Olayan
 2014: Swedish: Lidandets konung: Historien om cancer, Albert Bonniers Förlag.
 2014: Thai: จักรพรรดิแห่งโรคร้าย ชีวประวัติโรคมะเร็ง : The Emperor of All Maladies : A Biography of Cancer, สุนันทา วรรณสินธ์ เบล แปล, สำนักพิมพ์มติชน.
 2015: Persian: "سرطان امپراطور بیماری‌ها", The House of Biology.
 2015: Icelandic: "Meistari allra meina: Ævisaga krabbameins", Forlagið.
 2015: Czech: "Vládkyně všech nemocí", Masarykova univerzita.
 2017: Persian: «پادشاه همۀ امراض», Salekan.

See also 
 Cancer (2015 PBS film)
 History of cancer
 History of cancer chemotherapy

Notes and references

Further reading 
 Mukherjee's New York Times Magazine article based on his book.

External links 

Discussion of The Emperor of All Maladies with Mukherjee, February 18, 2011 at C-SPAN
Discussion of The Emperor of All Maladies with Mukherjee, September 25, 2011 at C-SPAN

Pulitzer Prize for General Non-Fiction-winning works
2010 non-fiction books
Books about cancer